Bill Weld (born 1945) is an American politician.

William Weld may also refer to:

William Gordon Weld (1775–1825), American shipmaster
William Fletcher Weld (1800–1881), American shipping magnate